The men's hammer throw event at the 2008 World Junior Championships in Athletics was held in Bydgoszcz, Poland, at Zawisza Stadium on 10 and 12 July.  A 6 kg (junior implement) hammer was used.

Medalists

Results

Final
12 July

Qualifications
10 July

Group A

Group B

Participation
According to an unofficial count, 30 athletes from 20 countries participated in the event.

References

Hammer throw
Hammer throw at the World Athletics U20 Championships